Captain Nellie Jane DeWitt was the sixth and final Superintendent of the Navy Nurse Corps and became its first Director.

Early life
Nellie Jane DeWitt was born in Susquehanna, Pennsylvania to Peter and Ella C DeWitt and grew up on her family's farm in Jackson, Pennsylvania. She attended Susquehanna High School.
She graduated from Stamford Hospital School of Nursing in Stamford, Connecticut in 1917.

Navy Nurse Corps career
CAPT DeWitt joined the Navy Nurse Corps on October 26, 1918. Her first post was Naval Hospital, Charleston, South Carolina. She joined the Regular ranks in 1922. Duty stations included Newport, Rhode Island; Portsmouth, Virginia; Puget Sound; Washington, DC; San Diego, CA; Guantanamo Bay, Cuba. She was promoted to Chief Nurse in April 1937 and served as Chief Nurse at the Naval hospital, Aiea Heights in Hawaii.

Contributions as Superintendent
CAPT DeWitt took over as Superintendent in April 1946 at a time when the Nurse Corps was shrinking in size due to demobilization after World War II.
On April 16, 1947, the Navy Nurse Corps became a staff corps, meaning that officers in the Nurse Corps were Navy officers. CAPT DeWitt became the Director of the Navy Nurse Corps.  She retired on May 1, 1950 and returned to Pennsylvania.

Later life
DeWitt led an active retirement life in Pennsylvania. She consulted for the Girl Scouts on health matters, was president of the Susquehanna County Unit of the American Cancer Society, and was a Distinguished Daughter of Pennsylvania.  The Business and Professional Women's Club in Susquehanna took her name for their chapter.
At the time of her death, she had returned to the DC area and was living at Vinson Hall, the Navy and Marine Corps Retirement Center, in McLean, Virginia. She died there on 22 March 1978 at the age of 82 and was buried in the Nurse's section of Arlington National Cemetery.

Further reading

 "Nellie DeWitt, 82, Retired Navy Captain", The Washington Post, Mar 27, 1978.

External links
Nurses and the U.S. Navy -- Overview and Special Image Selection Naval Historical Center

1895 births
1950 deaths
United States Navy Nurse Corps officers
Female United States Navy nurses in World War II
United States Navy captains
Female United States Navy officers
Burials at Arlington National Cemetery
American nursing administrators
American women nurses